Azadeh Bokaie Dadgar  (born August 6, 1980) is an Iranian lawyer, journalist, editor, and women's rights activist.

Early life
Azadeh Bokaie Dadgar was born on August 6, 1980, in Arak, Iran. She has a four-year-old daughter named Andiya.

Career
She began writing with the Lalleh Sorkh newspaper in Arak at the age of 19, and later became the editor of the Atreyas newspaper.

Arrests
In 2017, she was arrested after the Iranian Presidential Elections. Radio Deutschland and the Human Rights Organization of Iran criticized this arrest. In 2018, during protests in January, she was arrested again at her mother's house. In the same year, she was arrested a second time by the Markazi Intelligence Organization. In total, Azadeh Bokai has been arrested more than 3 times by Iranian law enforcement, judicial, and intelligence agencies

Awards 
In 2015 and 2016, on National Reporter's Day in Iran, she was acknowledged as the most active and most experienced female reporter in the province of Markazi, Iran.

Zodiac Sign 
Leo

References

1980 births
Living people
Iranian women lawyers
Iranian women's rights activists
Iranian journalists
Iranian activists
People from Arak, Iran